Simon de Langham (1310 – 22 July 1376) was an English clergyman who was Archbishop of Canterbury and a cardinal.

Life
Langham was born at Langham in Rutland. The manor of Langham was a property of Westminster Abbey, and he had become a monk in the Benedictine Abbey of St Peter at Westminster by 1346, and later prior and then abbot of this house.

Treasurer of England
In November 1360, Langham was made Treasurer of England and on 10 January 1362 he became Bishop of Ely and was consecrated on 20 March 1362. During his time as Bishop of Ely he was a major benefactor of Peterhouse, Cambridge, giving them the rectory of Cherry Hinton. He resigned the Treasurership before 20 February 1363, and was appointed Chancellor of England on 21 February 1363.

Archbishop of Canterbury
He was chosen Archbishop of Canterbury on 24 July 1366.

Perhaps the most interesting incident in Langham's primacy was when he drove the secular clergy from their college of Canterbury Hall, Oxford, and filled their places with monks. The expelled head of the seculars was a certain John de Wiclif, who has been identified with the great reformer Wycliffe.

Notwithstanding the part Langham as Chancellor had taken in the anti-papal measures of 1365 and 1366, he was made cardinal of San Sisto Vecchio by Pope Urban V in 1368. This step lost him the favour of Edward III; two months later, he resigned his archbishopric and went to Avignon. He had already resigned the chancellorship on 18 July 1367. He was soon allowed to hold other although less exalted positions in England.

Death
In 1374, he was elected Archbishop of Canterbury for the second time, but he withdrew his claim and died at Avignon on 22 July 1376.

Langham left the residue of his large estate  and his library to Westminster Abbey, and has been called its second founder. His bequest paid for the building of the western section of the nave. Langham's tomb, the work of Henry Yevele, is the oldest monument to an ecclesiastic in the Abbey.

Citations

References
 
 

Cardinal-bishops of Palestrina
Lord chancellors of England
Bishops of Ely
Archbishops of Canterbury
Abbots of Westminster
14th-century English Roman Catholic archbishops
People from Rutland
1310 births
1376 deaths
Lord High Treasurers of England
English Benedictines
Burials at Westminster Abbey
14th-century English cardinals